Gerastos is a genus of  proetid trilobite in the family Proetidae that lived between the Pragian and Eifelian of the Lower-Middle Devonian, spanning approximately 21 million years.

It was described by Goldfuss in 1843.

Distribution 
Gerastos has been found in the Devonian of Belgium, Germany, the Czech Republic and Morocco.

Description 
Gerastos has holochroal eyes situated to the side of its enlarged glabella region of the cephalon. The surface of the cephalon can be smooth or covered with pustules.

Length rarely exceeds 3 cm.

References 

Proetidae
Proetida genera